The Evil Thereof is a 1916 American silent drama film directed by Robert G. Vignola and starring Frank Losee and Grace Valentine.

Plot
A wealthy, amoral broker (Losee) seduces a manicurist (Valentine) and makes her his mistress, taking her away from her fiancé, a young barber (Kent).

The manicurist soon comes to detest the broker, but she has no choice except to stay with him, as respectable society considers her a "fallen woman." Then, at a dinner party, the broker, in full detail, tells his assembled guests the story of how he brought the manicurist up from nothing and gave her everything she had. Now completely humiliated and thinking only of how she has ruined her life, the manicurist takes her dinner knife and stabs the broker to death.

Cast

Frank Losee as the broker
Grace Valentine as the manicurist
Crauford Kent as the barber
Henry Hallam as her father
George Le Guere as the boy

References

External links

The Evil Thereof (1916) at TCM Database

1916 films
Paramount Pictures films
American silent feature films
Films directed by Robert G. Vignola
1916 drama films
Silent American drama films
American black-and-white films
1910s American films
1910s English-language films